Rock My Heart is a 2017 German drama film directed by Hanno Olderdissen and written by Clemente Fernandez-Gil and Hanno Olderdissen. The plot revolves around the 17-year-old girl Jana (Lena Klenke), with a congenital heart condition. She is, despite her illness, recruited by the racehorse trainer Paul Brenner (Dieter Hallervorden) to be his next prospective jockey.

Plot summary
17-year-old Jana (Lena Klenke) suffers from a congenital heart condition. Jana forms an unlikely bond with an unruly black stallion, and is recruited by racehorse trainer Paul Brenner (Dieter Hallervorden) to be his next prospective jockey.

Cast

Release and reception
Rock My Heart was released in theatres on September 28, 2017 in Germany, and was later released on June 6, 2019 on Netflix streaming.

Awards

References

External links 
 
 

2017 films
2017 drama films
German drama films
2010s German-language films
2010s German films